Toveh Khoshkeh (also known as  Toveh Khoshkeh Jalālvand and Tū Khoshkeh) is a village in Jalalvand Rural District, Firuzabad District, Kermanshah County, Kermanshah Province, Iran. At the 2006 census, its population was 53, in 13 families.

References 

Populated places in Kermanshah County